Love, Honor, and Oh Baby! is a 1933 American pre-Code comedy film, starring Slim Summerville, ZaSu Pitts, and George Barbier. The 1940 Universal Pictures film with the same title is not a remake. Adapted from the stage play, "Oh, Promise Me". Pitts plays a secretary that plots with her ambulance chasing lawyer, Slim, to compromise her employer for a breach of promise suit. Besides recovering handsomely at the trail, her boyfriend is provided with a case. A capable group of stars rounds out the rest of the cast that includes Donald Meek, Lucille Gleason and Varree Teasdale. The movie did not do well nor was it well reviewed by The New York Times which called it unfunny.

Cast 

Slim Summerville as Mark Reed
ZaSu Pitts as Connie Clark
George Barbier as Jasper B. Ogden
Lucille Gleason as Flo Bowen
Verree Teasdale as Elsie Carpenter
Donald Meek as Luther Bowen
Purnell Pratt as Marchall Durant
Adrienne Dore as Louise
Dorothy Granger as Mrs. Brown
Neely Edwards as Mr. Brown
Henry Kolker as The Judge

References

External links
 Love, Honor, and Oh Baby! at TCMDB

Review of film at Variety

American black-and-white films
1933 comedy films
1933 films
American comedy films
Films directed by Edward Buzzell
1930s American films